Inka Mach'ay (Quechua inka Inca, mach'ay cave, "Inca cave", hispanicized spellings Incamachay, Inca Machay) is an archaeological site in Bolivia. Inka Mach'ay was declared a National Monument on May 27, 1958, by Supreme Decrete No. 4954.

References 

Archaeological sites in Bolivia
Buildings and structures in Chuquisaca Department